Edward Spence may refer to:
Edward Spence (VC) (1830–1858), British Army soldier who received the Victoria Cross
Edward Falles Spence (1832–1892), American politician
E. Lee Spence (born 1947), American archaeologist

See also 
Benjamin Edward Spence (1822–1866), English sculptor